Connecticut's 18th State Senate district elects one member of the Connecticut State Senate. It consists of the towns of Griswold, Groton, Sterling, Voluntown, Stonington, North Stonington, Plainfield, and Preston. It is currently represented by Republican Heather Somers, who has been serving since 2017.

Recent elections

2020

2018

2016

2014

2012

References

18